William Hugh Woodin (born April 23, 1955) is an American mathematician and set theorist at Harvard University. He has made many notable contributions to the theory of inner models and determinacy. A type of large cardinals, the Woodin cardinals, bear his name.

Biography

Born in Tucson, Arizona, Woodin earned his Ph.D. from the University of California, Berkeley in 1984 under Robert M. Solovay. His dissertation title was Discontinuous Homomorphisms of C(Omega) and Set Theory. He served as chair of the Berkeley mathematics department for the 2002–2003 academic year. Woodin is a managing editor of the Journal of Mathematical Logic. He was elected a Fellow of the American Academy of Arts and Sciences in 2000.

He is the great-grandson of William Hartman Woodin, former Secretary of the Treasury.

Work
He has done work on the theory of generic multiverses and the related concept of Ω-logic, which suggested an argument that the continuum hypothesis is either undecidable or false in the sense of mathematical platonism. Woodin criticizes this view arguing that it leads to a counterintuitive reduction in which all truths in the set theoretical universe can be decided from a small part of it. He claims that these and related mathematical results lead (intuitively) to the conclusion that the continuum hypothesis has a truth value and the Platonistic approach is reasonable.

Woodin now predicts that there should be a way of constructing an inner model for almost all known large cardinals, which he calls the Ultimate L and which would have similar properties as Gödel's constructible universe. In particular, the continuum hypothesis would be true in this universe.

Honors 
In 2008, Woodin held the Gödel Lecture titled The Continuum Hypothesis, the Conjecture, and the inner model problem of one supercompact cardinal.

See also
AD+

References

External links

Home page at University of California, Berkeley
Woodin's plenary talk at the 2010 International Congress of Mathematicians
Incompatible Ω-Complete Theories  (with Peter Koellner),  Journal of Symbolic Logic, Volume 74, Issue 4 (2009), 1155–1170..

American logicians
20th-century American mathematicians
21st-century American mathematicians
1955 births
Living people
Fellows of the American Academy of Arts and Sciences
University of California, Berkeley alumni
University of California, Berkeley faculty
Set theorists
Tarski lecturers
Hausdorff Medal winners
Gödel Lecturers